The 1979 FIM Motocross World Championship was the 23rd F.I.M. Motocross Racing World Championship season.

Summary

Graham Noyce won the 1979 500cc world championship for the Honda factory racing team, marking Honda's first ever motocross world championship as well as the first motocross world championship for a British rider since Jeff Smith in 1965. Yamaha's defending champion Heikki Mikkola struggled to recover from a broken leg suffered in preseason. Noyce's consistent results earned him the championship points lead at the midpoint of the season with Suzuki's Gerrit Wolsink, Mikkola and Kawasaki's Brad Lackey within reach of the points lead. Wolsink won his fifth 500cc United States Grand Prix in six years and followed that with another victory at the Canadian Grand Prix to narrow the points lead. Mikkola then suffered another injury at the Canadian Grand Prix and his injuries forced him to sit out the West German Grand Prix. Former Honda factory rider, Lackey, won 6 individual moto victories, more than any other rider in the championship yet, his factory sponsored Kawasaki proved to be unreliable as the team struggled through development issues on a new motorcycle. Noyce then took command of the championship by posting a series of top five finishes to win the title for the Honda team.

Håkan Carlqvist won the 250cc world championship for Husqvarna while Harry Everts dominated the 125cc world championship for the Suzuki factory racing team.

Grands Prix

500cc

250cc

125cc

Final standings

References

External links
 

FIM Motocross World Championship season
Motocross World Championship seasons